"Ya Tú Me Conoces" (English: "You Already Know Me") is a song by Mexican singer Thalía and Venezuelan duo Mau y Ricky, from Thalía's seventeenth studio album Desamorfosis. It was released by Sony Music Latin on January 24, 2020.

Background and release
"Ya Tú Me Conoces" was co-written by Mau y Ricky themselves as well as Colombian singer-songwriter Camilo. The song marks the second time that Thalía has collaborated with Ricky Montaner, who wrote her 2014 hit single "Por Lo Que Reste De Vida". The song was released on all digital platforms on January 24, 2020.

Chart performance
The song entered several charts in Latin American countries as well as some U.S. Latin charts.

Live performances
Thalía performed the song along with Mau y Ricky at Premio Lo Nuestro 2020, where she was also a co-host.

Music video
The video for the single was released on the same day as the song. The video shows Thalía with Mau y Ricky dancing while wearing different bright colored outfits. The video was produced by 2 Wolves Film and it was directed by David Bóhorques.

Charts

Weekly charts

Year-end charts

References 

Thalía songs
2020 singles
Sony Music Latin singles
Spanish-language songs
Songs written by Mau Montaner